Cemil Çiçek (born 15 November 1946) is a Turkish politician who was the Speaker of the Parliament of Turkey between 4 July 2011 and 7 June 2015. Previously he was Minister of Justice from 2002 to 2007 and Deputy Prime Minister from 2007 to 2011. He was also a Justice and Development Party Member of Parliament from Ankara.

Early life
He was born on 15 November 1946 in Yozgat, Turkey. He graduated from the Law Faculty of Istanbul University. In 1983, he joined the centre-right ANAP. He became an ANAP MP for Yozgat, and in the late 1980s Minister of State responsible for "the family". In this role he was known for his conservative views on matters of sex and marriage.

Political career
He later became Minister for Energy and Natural Resources but was expelled from ANAP in 1997, upon which he joined the Islamic leaning Fazilet Party, which later evolved into the AKP.

He was Minister of Justice in the first AKP government (from 2003 to 2007), when as a former ANAP MP he was thought to be one of the leading figures of the AKP most acceptable to the Turkish military. During his ministry, he had to deal with situations including:
 the 2003 Istanbul bombings 
 the release of former MP Leyla Zana from prison, 
 the prosecutions of a number of police officers accused of torturing prisoners, 
 an attempted suicide bombing of his ministry.

His legislation included stricter controls of prisons (in 2006).

Speaker of the Parliament
Cemil Çiçek of the AKP became the new parliament speaker of Turkey in the third round of voting on 4 July 2011. Çiçek received 302 votes in the first round voting, while Nationalist Movement Party (MHP) parliamentarian Tunca Toskay received 50 votes. The AKP's second candidate, Zelkif Kazdal, received 23 votes and withdrew his nomination after the first round. Çiçek went on to win 322 votes and Tunca Toskay won 52 in the second round of voting. Çiçek was elected as the new speaker with 322 votes in the third round, in which Toskay received 50 votes. Three votes were declared invalid. In his speech after his election, Çiçek appealed to the opposition parties that were boycotting Parliament to take their oaths. "Parliament should be a place of work, not of conflict. We have many issues to solve. We can't afford to waste any time," Çiçek said.

Quotes
 The mentality of the general public is the prime obstacle to rule of law (in Turkey). "Our public does not want justice, they just want their own affairs sorted out. They want to see corruption investigated but they are not ashamed to manage their own affairs corruptly. The public actually doesn't care about corruption. They say "let someone tackle it while we watch and see who wins" as if it were a football match. He then went to blame the professional bodies for not exposing corruption among their members.
 The Islamic world will get nowhere by blaming all its problems on the outside world and making itself out to be a white spoon just pulled out of the milk
 (Upon the release from prison of Leyla Zana..)The Turkish courts have played their part. Now the EU has no excuse (not to begin entry negotiations with Turkey) 
 Article 138 of the Constitution has become extinct in this country (the article that guarantees the independence of the judiciary)

References

1946 births
People from Yozgat
Istanbul University Faculty of Law alumni
Living people
Speakers of the Parliament of Turkey
Deputy Prime Ministers of Turkey
Government ministers of Turkey
Motherland Party (Turkey) politicians
Justice and Development Party (Turkey) politicians
Ministers of Justice of Turkey
Health ministers of Turkey
Members of the 24th Parliament of Turkey
Members of the 23rd Parliament of Turkey
Members of the 22nd Parliament of Turkey
Members of the 21st Parliament of Turkey
Members of the 20th Parliament of Turkey
Members of the 46th government of Turkey
Members of the 47th government of Turkey
Members of the 26th Parliament of Turkey
Ministers of State of Turkey
Members of the 60th government of Turkey